The 1982 Camel GT Championship season was the 12th season of the IMSA GT Championship auto racing series.  It was the first year of the GTP class, which combined the previous GTX class of Group 5 cars and prototypes.  Other competitors ran in the GTO and GTU classes of Grand Tourer-style racing cars.  It began January 30, 1982, and ended November 28, 1982, after nineteen rounds.

Schedule
The GTU class did not participate with the GTP and GTO classes in shorter events, instead holding their own separate event which included touring car competitors from the IMSA Champion Spark Plug Challenge.  These touring cars did not race for points in the IMSA GT Championship.  Races marked with All had all classes on track at the same time.

Season results

External links
 World Sports Racing Prototypes - 1982 IMSA GT Championship results

IMSA GT Championship seasons
IMSA GT